Aliabad-e Sartol (also Romanized as ‘Alīābād-e Sartol; also known as ‘Alīābād) is a village in Sarrud-e Jonubi Rural District, in the Central District of Boyer-Ahmad County, Kohgiluyeh and Boyer-Ahmad Province, Iran. At the 2006 census, its population was 323, in 68 families.

References 

Populated places in Boyer-Ahmad County